Nifty Gateway is a digital art online auction platform for non-fungible token (NFT) art founded by Duncan and Griffin Cock Foster, and has since been acquired by the Winklevoss twins. Nifty Gateway has sold NFTs by Beeple,  Pak, Refik Anadol and other widely followed NFT artists.

In March 2021, Nifty Gateway began a partnership with the auction house Sotheby's.

Account takeovers
In March 2021, a small number of users of the platform were hacked. A common theme across all the users that were hacked was that they all did not have 2-factor authentication activated. It is speculated that the hack was a result of cracking or otherwise acquiring their individual passwords. Nifty Gateway released a statement saying its initial investigation had found “no evidence” the platform itself was breached. Nifty Gateway was able to reverse all transactions made via stolen credit card information, although it raised questions regarding new users understanding of cryptocurrency's decentralization.

One user planned to file a police report and contact their insurance company, but did not, stating “there’s nothing I can do per the Nifty terms of service.”

References

External links
Official site

Blockchain art
Blockchain and auctions